Pierre Antoine may refer to:

 Pierre Antoine Deblois (1815–1898), Quebec farmer, businessman and political figure
 Pierre Antoine Delalande (1787–1823), French naturalist and explorer
 Pierre Antoine Marie Crozy (1831–1903), French canna and rose breeder
 Peter Anthony Motteux, born Pierre Antoine Motteux (1663–1718), English translator and dramatist
 Pierre Antoine Noël Bruno, comte Daru (1767–1829), French soldier, statesman, historian and poet
 Pierre Antoine Poiteau (1766–1854), French botanist, gardener and botanical artist

See also
 Antoine Pierre
 Pierre-Antoine